Thomson Mason may refer to:
Thomson Mason (1733–1785), Virginia lawyer, jurist, and Chief Justice of the Supreme Court of Virginia
Thomson Mason (1759–1820) (1759–1820), entrepreneur, planter, civil servant, and justice
Thomson Francis Mason (1785–1838), jurist, lawyer, councilman, judge, and the mayor of Alexandria, District of Columbia (now Virginia) between 1827 and 1830

See also 
 Thomas Mason (disambiguation)